Dry Sandford Pit is a  biological and geological Site of Special Scientific Interest north-west of Abingdon-on-Thames in Oxfordshire. It is a Geological Conservation Review site and it is managed as a nature reserve by the Berkshire, Buckinghamshire and Oxfordshire Wildlife Trust.

This former sand quarry exposes a sequence of limestone rocks laid down in shallow coastal waters during the Oxfordian stage of the Jurassic, around 160 million years ago. It has many fossil ammonites. It has diverse calcareous habitats, including fen, grassland, scrub and heath. It is nationally important entomologically, especially for bees and wasps.

References

Berkshire, Buckinghamshire and Oxfordshire Wildlife Trust
Sites of Special Scientific Interest in Oxfordshire
Geological Conservation Review sites